Nari, also spelled Naree, is a Korean feminine given name. Unlike most Korean names, which are composed of two Sino-Korean roots each written with one hanja, "Nari" is an indigenous Korean name: a single word meaning "lily". It is one of a number of such indigenous names which became more popular in South Korea in the late 20th century.

People with this name include:
Naomi Nari Nam (born 1985), American figure skater of Korean descent
Na Ry (born 1985), South Korean beauty pageant winner
Naree Song (born 1986), South Korean golfer
Park Na-ri (born 1988), South Korean swimmer
Kim Na-ri (born 1990), South Korean tennis player
Jong Na-ri, North Korean swimmer, bronze medalist in synchronized swimming at the 2014 Asian Games

See also
List of Korean given names
Lily (name)

References

Korean feminine given names